Imre Rajczy (8 November 1911 – 31 March 1978) was a Hungarian fencer. He won a gold medal in the team sabre event at the 1936 Summer Olympics. After World War II, in 1945 he emigrated to Argentina.

References

External links
 

1911 births
1978 deaths
Hungarian emigrants to Argentina
Austro-Hungarian emigrants to Argentina
Hungarian male sabre fencers
Olympic fencers of Hungary
Fencers at the 1936 Summer Olympics
Olympic gold medalists for Hungary
Sportspeople from Szombathely
Olympic medalists in fencing
Medalists at the 1936 Summer Olympics